The Detroit Pistons are an American professional basketball team based in Detroit, Michigan. They play in the Central Division of the Eastern Conference in the National Basketball Association (NBA). The team, owned by Tom Gores, plays its home games at Little Caesars Arena. The franchise was founded in 1941 by Fred Zollner as the Fort Wayne Zollner Pistons, playing in the National Basketball League (NBL). In 1948, the team was renamed to the Fort Wayne Pistons and joined the Basketball Association of America (BAA), which merged with the NBL to become the NBA a year later. After spending nine seasons in Fort Wayne, Indiana, Zollner moved the team to Detroit, Michigan in 1957 to be able to compete financially with other big city teams. In the 1980s, general manager Jack McCloskey was instrumental in the Pistons' future championship runs by drafting Isiah Thomas, acquiring key players like Joe Dumars and Dennis Rodman and hiring head coach Chuck Daly. The 1980s team, known today as "the Bad Boys" due to the physical playing style, eventually won two championships in the 1989 and 1990 NBA Finals under Daly. The Pistons won their third and most recent title in the 2004 NBA Finals under the tenure of Larry Brown.

There have been 36 head coaches for the Pistons franchise since joining the NBA. The franchise's first head coach while in the NBA was Carl Bennett, who coached the team for six games, all of which are losses. Chuck Daly is the franchise's all-time leader in regular-season games coached (738), regular-season games won (467), playoff games coached (113), and playoff games won (71); Flip Saunders is the franchise's all-time leader in regular-season winning percentage (.715). Daly and Larry Brown are the only members of the franchise to have been inducted into the Basketball Hall of Fame as coaches; Daly was also selected as one of the top 10 coaches in NBA history. Former coach Dick Vitale was named to the Basketball Hall of Fame in honor of the work he did as a basketball broadcaster after leaving the Pistons. Sixteen head coaches have spent their entire NBA head coaching careers with the Pistons. Curly Armstrong, Red Rocha, Dick McGuire, Dave DeBusschere, Donnis Butcher, Terry Dischinger, Earl Lloyd, Scott, and Michael Curry formerly played for the team. The current head coach of the Pistons is Dwane Casey.

Key

Coaches
The list does not include NBL seasons.

Notes
 A running total of the number of coaches of the Pistons. Thus, any coach who has two or more separate terms as head coach is only counted once.
 Each year is linked to an article about that particular NBA season.

References
General

Specific

Lists of National Basketball Association head coaches by team

Head coaches